Paul-André Meyer (21 August 1934 – 30 January 2003) was a French mathematician, who played a major role in the development of the general theory of stochastic processes. 
He worked at the Institut de Recherche Mathématique (IRMA) in Strasbourg and is known as the founder of the 'Strasbourg school' in stochastic analysis.

Biography

Meyer was born in 1934 in Boulogne, a suburb of Paris.
His family fled from France in 1940 and sailed to Argentina, settling in Buenos Aires, where Paul-André attended a French school. He returned to Paris in 1946 and entered the Lycée Janson de Sailly, where he first encountered advanced mathematics through his teacher, M Heilbronn. He entered the École Normale Supérieure in 1954 where he studied mathematics. There, he attended lectures on probability by Michel Loève, a former disciple of Paul Lévy who had come from Berkeley to spend a year in Paris. These lectures triggered Meyer's interest in the theory of stochastic processes, and he went on to  write a thesis in potential theory, on multiplicative and additive functionals of Markov processes, under the supervision of Jacques Deny.

After his doctoral thesis, Meyer traveled to the United States and worked for a couple of years with the American mathematician Joseph Doob, who was then developing new ideas in the theory of stochastic processes. It was there that he derived his famous theorem on the decomposition of a submartingale, now   known as the Doob–Meyer decomposition. After his return to France he established a group in Strasbourg where he ran his famous 'Séminaire de probabilités de Strasbourg', which became an epicenter for the development of the theory of stochastic processes in France for two decades.

Scientific work

Meyer is best known for his continuous-time analog of Doob's decomposition of a submartingale, known as the Doob–Meyer decomposition and his work on the 'general theory' of stochastic processes, published in his monumental book Probabilities and Potential, written with Claude Dellacherie.

Some of his main areas of research in probability theory were the general theory of stochastic processes, Markov processes, stochastic integration, stochastic differential geometry and quantum probability. His most cited book is Probabilities and Potential B, written with Claude Dellacherie. The preceding book is the English translation of the second book in a series of five written by Meyer and Dellacherie from 1975 to 1992 and elaborated from Meyer's pioneering book Probabilités et Potentiel, published in 1966.

In the period 1966-1980 Meyer organised the Seminaire de Probabilities in Strasbourg, and he and his co-workers developed what is called the general theory of processes.

This theory was concerned with the mathematical foundations of the theory of continuous time stochastic processes, especially Markov processes. Notable achievements of the 'Strasbourg School' were the development of stochastic integrals for semimartingales, and the concept of a predictable (or previsible) process.

IRMA created an annual prize in his memory; the first Paul André Meyer prize was awarded in 2004 .

Persi Diaconis of Stanford University wrote about Meyer that:

Some books and articles written by Paul-André Meyer

C. Dellacherie, P.A. Meyer: Probabilities and Potential B, North-Holland, Amsterdam New York 1982.
P.A. Meyer: " Martingales and Stochastic Integrals I," Springer Lecture Notes in Mathematics 284, 1972.
Brelot's axiomatic theory of the Dirichlet problem and Hunt's theory, Annales de l'Institut Fourier, 13 no. 2 (1963), p. 357–372
Intégrales stochastiques I, Séminaire de probabilités de Strasbourg, 1 (1967), p. 72–94
Intégrales stochastiques II, Séminaire de probabilités de Strasbourg, 1 (1967), p. 95–117
Intégrales stochastiques III, Séminaire de probabilités de Strasbourg, 1 (1967), p. 118–141
Intégrales stochastiques IV, Séminaire de probabilités de Strasbourg, 1 (1967), p. 124–162
Generation of sigma-fields by step processes, Séminaire de probabilités de Strasbourg, 10 (1976), p. 118–124
P.A. Meyer: ' Inégalités de normes pour les integrales stochastiques," Séminaire de Probabilités XII, Springer Lecture Notes in Math. 649, 757–762, 1978.

References

External links
In memory of P. A. Meyer
Colloque international sur les processus stochastiques et l’héritage de P.A. Meyer
 
 

Probability theorists
Members of the French Academy of Sciences
École Normale Supérieure alumni
20th-century French mathematicians
1934 births
2003 deaths